Pinni may also refer to:

 Pinni North Indian cuisine dish that is eaten mostly in winters.
 Pinni (cloth) a handwoven cotton goods of Burma.
Pinni (film)  a 2020 Indian Hindi-language family drama film.